Kato Achaia is a town and a community in Achaea, West Greece, Greece. Since the 2011 local government reform it is part of the municipality West Achaea, of which it is the seat of administration. The community Kato Achaia consists of the town Kato Achaia and the villages Alykes, Manetaiikia, Paralia Kato Achaias and Piso Sykea. Nearby are the ruins of the ancient city of Dyme.

Kato Achaia is located 1 km south of the Gulf of Patras and 20 km southwest of Patras. The villages Alykes and Paralia Kato Achaias are on the coast. The Greek National Road 9 (Patras - Pyrgos) passes outside the town. Kato Achaia has a train station on the partly disused Patras–Pyrgos railway. Currently, train traffic is offered between Patras and Kato Achaia.

Population history

Gallery

References

Populated places in Achaea